Kydia is a genus of flowering plants in the family Malvaceae, found in the Indian subcontinent, southern China and Southeast Asia. Some sources consider it to be monotypic, with Kydia calycina the only species; certainly K. calycina is the beststudied species, as it is widely exploited, even cultivated, for timber and fiber.

Species
Currently accepted species include:

Kydia calycina Roxb.
Kydia glabrescens Mast.

References

Malvaceae
Malvaceae genera